Sidy Keba Coly, known as Keba Coly (born 20 February 1998) is a Senegalese football player.

Club career

Roma
He began playing for the Roma's Under-19 squad in the 2016–17 season and scored 16 goals in all competitions in his first season. He made his debut for the senior squad during the summer 2017 pre-season camp. On 28 September 2017, he signed a 4-year senior contract with the club.

Loan to Ascoli
On 17 August 2018, he joined Serie B club Ascoli on loan with option to purchase.

He made his Serie B debut for Ascoli on 4 May 2019 in a game against Palermo, as an 87th-minute substitute for Moutir Chajia.

Loan to Rende
On 31 August 2019, he joined Serie C club Rende on loan.

References

External links
 

1998 births
Footballers from Dakar
Living people
Senegalese footballers
Association football forwards
A.S. Roma players
Ascoli Calcio 1898 F.C. players
Serie B players
Serie C players
Senegalese expatriate footballers
Expatriate footballers in Italy